Sterling Patrick Long-Colbo (born April 21) is an entrepreneur with focuses on espionage entertainment, fitness and outdoor education, live event production, and working with children, particularly with respect to Scouting.

Biography 
Sterling Patrick Long-Colbo was born in Madison, Wisconsin, the only child of his father, Donald Stratton Colbo, a petroleum engineer, and his mother, Patrica Long, a European/South American socialite, who owned an equestrian academy, Los Chibchas Stables, with her sister. He attended Madison Edgewood High School for two years, then Madison West High School, where he graduated, and then attended the University of Wisconsin. He is the grandson of Ella Statton Colbo, a primary education teacher that was a noted author and playwright. Born Roman Catholic (his great uncle was a Cardinal), he served as an altar boy at St. Joseph Church.

Business

Author & producer
Long-Colbo is also the original story creator, and co-author and producer on a new action adventure mystery book, comic, webisode and film series titled The 7 Scouts (working title).

Long-Colbo describes "the idea of a Mission: Impossible team for teens appeals to all kids and teens. Detectives and Super Scouts, it's the Hardy Boys meets Ocean's Eleven and Mission: Impossible for the 21st century!"

On September 16, 2009, Sterling Long-Colbo, on behalf of the 7 Scouts (working title) and Sterling Long-Colbo Productions announced that internationally known U.S. and German television and film actor Rudolf Martin, formerly the unforgettable terrorist Ari Haswari on the highly acclaimed hit series NCIS, will be featured as a villain on the cover of "The 7 Scouts And The Mystery Of The Commie Spies" the first action-adventure teen mystery book presented by the 7 Scouts, to be followed by comics and graphic novels, and a series of prequel webisodes and trailers for the book and film.

Martin, an owner, producer and active participant of the 7 Scouts, will also serve as a PR representative and goodwill ambassador for the 7 Scouts and describes the action filled story as "The Goonies meets The Bourne Identity" and credits its "roller coaster" pace as the reason he came aboard as a central book character, web and film actor, owner and producer.

The webisode prequel series has enlisted a major motion picture director and other notable cinematic villains in order to develop the property in Harry Potter "famous-villain-actors" style.

The first installment, a book titled "The 7 Scouts and The Mystery of The Commie Spies", was released for pre-sale October 1, 2009, and will be released in stores in the fall of 2011 with an anticipated name and cover change (announced) and already boasts a fan club in the thousands.

In Spring 2001, Long-Colbo created, complied, and co-authored of Hauntorama's "How to Haunt Your House" that used the Halloween season to teach children how to be safe year round.

Espionage entertainment

Long-Colbo is an acknowledged expert in the field of themed entertainment, and particularly espionage. In 1991, he began developing Spyhouse, the first location-based entertainment venture in espionage, mystery, detectives and covert military operations. In 1993, he founded Spyhouse, Inc., a multi-platform company, to develop the Spyhouse concept worldwide. Long-Colbo and the Spyhouse project received extensive media attention, including articles in the Robb Report, Nation's Restaurant News, Restaurants & Institutions, Restaurant Business, Crain's Chicago Business, the Chicago Tribune, Variety, and the New York Post, among others. Such was Long-Colbo's expertise in themed entertainment that in 1994 he was invited to address the country's top restaurant executives at the Restaurants & Institutions Executive Conference in Laguna Niguel, on a panel that included Isaac Tigrett (co-founder, Hard Rock Café, and founder, House of Blues), Robert Earl (founder, Planet Hollywood), Larry Levy (Levy Restaurants), and Richard Melman (founder, Lettuce Entertain You Enterprises).

Also in 1994, Spyhouse was a co-producer of the 30th Anniversary Convention and Exhibit of James Bond "Goldfinger" in Los Angeles. In addition to securing the appearance of George Lazenby (the only "Bond" to appear at the convention) and the participation of The Ian Fleming Foundation, Spyhouse also secured the appearance of the original Aston Martin DB5 used in the film. Long-Colbo maintains a close relationship with Spy Guise, the world's largest vendor of espionage memorabilia and publisher of Cinema Retro Magazine. He also coordinated and promoted live entertainment and media events featuring espionage and James Bond 007 actors and celebrities in Los Angeles and Munich.

Long-Colbo has also consulted on the management, marketing and financial aspects of theme restaurants. He assisted in the promotion and opening of the House of Blues in New Orleans, including handling press releases, security, and press and celebrity relations. He also consulted to former NASCAR Café Board member Harold Pierce regarding merchandising, clothing, staffing, and concept development. Long-Colbo's espionage-based clients include producers and production companies, as well as Creations Entertainment (operator of licensed Star Trek, James Bond, Stargate, Xena, Doctor Who, and Battlestar Galactica conventions).

Long-Colbo also advised and helped create Media Point Productions' bid to develop the Secret Agent/Danger Man property into a major motion picture for ITV/Granada Productions United Kingdom, including development of the script, character, trailers, sound tracks, concept art, marketing posters, and other items.

In 2004, he informally and unofficially provided musical input to director J. J. Abrams for the film Mission: Impossible III having, at the behest of writer, producer and director Shane Black (Iron Man 3, Lethal Weapon, The Last Boy Scout, The Long Kiss Goodnight et al.), screened Black's as yet unreleased film, Kiss Kiss Bang Bang with Abrams in order for him to make final film casting decisions of actress Michelle Monaghan.

Long-Colbo also handled several personal PR and logistics for Black for the premier of Kiss Kiss Bang Bang at the Cannes Film Festival, including creating and producing US Premiere Private After Party events.

Legal issues
Boy Scouts Of America v. Sterling Patrick (long) Colbo.

General consulting
Long-Colbo spent several years consulting on various aspects of business and marketing development including raising capital and start up advice for businesses in the technology, 4G wireless, telecommunications and telecommunication devices, art publishing, and oil and gas.

Governor Jesse Ventura
In the fall of 2007, Sterling joined WWF (World Wrestling Federation, now WWE World Wrestling Entertainment) wrestler, actor, news & political commentator, television host of Conspiracy Theory with Jesse Ventura; Mayor and Governor Jesse Ventura to begin exploring business and philanthropic opportunities in several arenas.

Community service and charitable work

Boy Scouts and scouting

Long-Colbo joined the Boy Scouts of America (BSA) as a Cub Scout. Later he became a Scoutmaster, and even started his own Boy Scout programs. He credits his experience in the Boy Scouts with: learning first-hand about building relationships formed from being part of a group and working as a team; becoming—like most Boy Scout leaders—a better person himself; and the personal satisfaction comes from developing youth on the right path and helping others. This led him not only to remain a lifelong volunteer and mentor ("Scouter") in Wisconsin, New York, and California, but to teach youth self-sufficiency and to "do the right thing". He continues to dedicate time toward guiding, educating and nurturing teens in first aid, outdoor skills, and wilderness survival training. Among the activities he has led for Boy Scouts are: 15 to 75 mile hikes; rappelling, rafting, sailing, canoeing and mountain biking at Ten Mile River Boy Scout Camp (New York); and a 100-mile hike, rappelling, horseback riding and COPE course at Philmont Boy Scout High Adventure Base (New Mexico). Long-Colbo has taken extensive training with the Boy Scouts of America.

Long-Colbo's association with the Boy Scouts also led to one of the achievements of which he is most proud: a young boy—an Eagle Scout and Sea Scout Quartermaster (Quartermaster Award (Boy Scouts of America))—that he considers his "adopted son" whom, as a direct result of Long-Colbo's mentorship, is a member of the United States Navy SEALs.

Charitable work
Long-Colbo has been involved in extensive charitable work since his late teens and college years, during which he coordinated a number of events for the Boy Scouts and the Alzheimer's Association; and later the Boy Scouts, KaBOOM!, Boys & Girls Clubs of America (volunteer only), Share Our Strength, a program aimed at feeding homeless children (motto “No Kid Hungry”) with a stated goal to “End Childhood Hunger in America,” and is an Ambassador for ShelterBox USA.

In 2001, Long-Colbo founded Hauntorama, a nonprofit organization based in Los Angeles. Hauntorama developed their awareness, safety and abduction prevention/education programs in connection with Child Quest International (CQI). This two-year program was created to raise awareness of child abduction, and provide safety education nationwide leading up to Halloween – a night with significant abduction risks. He partnered Hauntorama with Radio Disney, secured $500,000 in nationwide media promotion, and distributed 75,000 Halloween Safety brochures in 44 markets nationwide, supported by public safety announcements in the same markets. Long-Colbo also secured Universal Home Video and Scholastic Books as sponsors, as well as securing the involvement of the families of Boris Karloff, Bela Lugosi, Lon Chaney, Peter Lorre, and Vincent Price. He also created, art-directed and produced the Hauntorama website.

Childhood 

Long-Colbo was a childhood magician for ten years, which included a performance to Johannes, 11th Prince of Thurn and Taxis, Serene Highness of The Princely House of Thurn and Taxis in Munich, Germany (Europe's largest landholders); representing the Abbott Magic Company at their trade exhibitions; a birthday performance for famous Vaudeville magician and winner of the 1st, 2nd and 3rd annual Harry Houdini Trophy, Ben Bergor; befriending Harry Blackstone, Jr. and being used by him as a stage assistant/volunteer whenever the Great Blackstone and he were in the same town.

References

External links 
Profile at sterling7.com

Living people
Year of birth missing (living people)
Madison West High School alumni